Sycamore (formerly, Loch-loch) is an unincorporated community in Colusa County, California. It lies near the mouth of Sycamore Slough, at an elevation of 49 feet (15 m).

References

Unincorporated communities in California
Unincorporated communities in Colusa County, California